General James White Memorial Civic Auditorium and Coliseum (usually shortened to Knoxville Civic Coliseum) is a multi-purpose events facility in Knoxville, Tennessee, owned by the Knoxville city government and managed by ASM. Its components are an auditorium with a maximum seating capacity of 2,500, a multi-purpose arena with a maximum seating capacity of 6,500, an exhibition hall and a reception hall. It was built in 1961.

The arena is home to the Knoxville Ice Bears, of the SPHL and the University of Tennessee Ice Vols, of the ACHA. In the past, the arena hosted the Knoxville Speed, of the UHL, the Knoxville Cherokees, of the ECHL and the Knoxville Knights, of the EHL. It was also the home of the Tennessee ThunderCats/Riverhawks professional indoor football franchise.

It was the main home arena for Smoky Mountain Wrestling, a regional wrestling promotion, run by pro wrestling Hall of Famer Jim Cornette from 1992 to 1995.

Performances hosted in the facility have included circuses, plays and musicals, symphony orchestra concerts, popular music concerts, and comedians. On March 18, 1982, the venue was notable to be the site of Randy Rhoads final show, before his death in a plane crash the very next day.

Chicago broke the record (at that time) for the fastest sellout to a concert at the Coliseum for their August 26, 1971, performance.

References

External links

Indoor arenas in Tennessee
Indoor ice hockey venues in the United States
Sports venues in Tennessee
Music venues in East Tennessee
Sports venues in Knoxville, Tennessee
Performing arts centers in Tennessee
1961 establishments in Tennessee
Sports venues completed in 1961
College ice hockey venues in the United States